The Conestabile Madonna is a small (and probably unfinished) painting by the Italian Renaissance artist Raphael for the Conte della Staffa, executed c. 1502–1504. It was likely the last work painted by Raphael in Umbria before moving to Florence.

Its name comes from the Conestabile della Staffa family of Perugia, from whom it was acquired by Alexander II of Russia on the 22. of April 1872. The Tsar presented it to his consort, Maria Alexandrovna. Since then, the painting has been on exhibit in the Hermitage Museum of St. Petersburg.

The painting portrays the Madonna holding the Child while reading a book. In 1881, when the picture was moved to canvas, it was discovered that in the original version the Madonna contemplated a pomegranate (symbol of the Passion) instead of the book.

See also
List of paintings by Raphael

Notes

References

External links
 

Paintings of the Madonna and Child by Raphael
Paintings of the Madonna and Child
Paintings in the collection of the Hermitage Museum
1500s paintings
Nude art
Unfinished paintings